Christiansfeld Municipality (Danish kommune) existed until January 1, 2007, in South Jutland County. It was named after Christiansfeld. The municipality covered an area of 211 km2, and had a total population of 9,585 (2005). Its last mayor was Jørgen From, a member of the Venstre (Liberal Party) political party.

 Aller Parish
 Bjerning Parish
 Christiansfeld Parish
 Fjelstrup Parish
 Frørup Parish
 Hejls Parish
 Hjerndrup Parish
 Stepping Parish
 Taps Parish
 Tyrstrup Parish
 Vejstrup Parish

Christiansfeld  municipality ceased to exist as the result of Kommunalreformen ("The Municipality Reform" of 2007). Bjerning, Hjerndrup and Fjelstrup parishes of Christiansfeld municipality were merged with Gram, Haderslev and Vojens municipalities to form a new Haderslev municipality.  The remainder of the municipality was merged into a new Kolding Municipality.

Former municipalities of Denmark

sv:Christiansfeld kommun